Belinda is a common female first name.

Belinda may also refer to:

Film and television
Belinda (film), a 1988 Australian film
 Belinda (telenovela), a 2004 Mexican series featuring Adriana Cataño
Belinda, a fictional character from Mona the Vampire

Literature
 Belinda (Allen book), a 1992 children's book by Pamela Allen
 Belinda (Rice novel), a novel by Anne Rice writing as Anne Rampling
 Belinda (Edgeworth novel), a novel by Maria Edgeworth
 Belinda (Broughton novel), a novel by Rhoda Broughton
 Belinda (play), a play by A. A. Milne
 Belinda (comic strip) or Belinda Blue-Eyes, a UK comic strip by Steve Dowling
 Belinda, a comics series by Guido Crepax
 Belinda, a character in Alexander Pope's 1712 poem The Rape of the Lock

Music
 Belinda (entertainer), Spanish-Mexican actress and singer
 Belinda (Belinda album)
 Belinda (Belinda Carlisle album)
 "Belinda" (song), by Eurythmics, 1981
 "Belinda", a 1971 song by Bobby Gentry from Patchwork

Places
 Belinda (moon), a moon of Uranus named after the heroine of The Rape of the Lock
 Belinda, Virginia, US, an unincorporated community
 Mount Belinda, a stratovolcano on Montagu Island in the South Sandwich Islands

Other uses
 Belinda, a genus of tussock moths
 Belinda (ship), a brig wrecked in 1824 in Western Australia
 Belinda (cigarette), a Dutch brand
 Stan Belinda (born 1966), American former Major League Baseball player